Sarah Siddons as the Tragic Muse, or Mrs. Siddons as the Tragic Muse, is a 1783–1784 painting by English painter Sir Joshua Reynolds. The 1784 version is in the Huntington Library art museum, while a 1789 reproduction from Reynolds's studio is in the Dulwich Picture Gallery.

Composition 
The painting depicts the actress Sarah Siddons as Melpomene, the muse of tragedy. Siddons wears a diadem and is dressed in an 18th-century costume adorned with pearls. She is seated on a large throne while behind her, figures personifying Pity and Terror stand in the shadows.

References

Sources

External links 
 Sarah Siddons as the Tragic Muse on Google Arts & Culture

Portraits by Joshua Reynolds
1784 paintings
Collection of the Huntington Library
Paintings in the Dulwich Picture Gallery